Steven Harold Carr (born April 7, 1965) is an American film director, music video director, and film producer from Brooklyn, New York. After studying fine arts on a full scholarship to Manhattan’s School of Visual Arts, Carr founded design firm The Drawing Board with Cey Adam to create iconic album artwork for Def Jam Recordings artists such as Beastie Boys, Public Enemy, LL Cool J and more. Asked to take his vision to film, Carr created groundbreaking videos for influential hip-hop artists from Slick Rick to Jay-Z, and was signed to Quentin Tarantino's A Band Apart Music Video production company in Los Angeles, CA.

In 2000 Steve Carr made his feature film directorial debut with comedy Next Friday starring rapper Ice Cube, that became the most successful film in the Friday franchise for box office earnings. Carr has since directed many box office hits including Dr. Doolittle 2, Daddy Day Care, and Paul Blart: Mall Cop and is currently working on an unnamed Netflix film project.

Career
Shortly after graduating from SVA, Carr convinced Russell Simmons to let him design all the album covers at Def Jam Records. Carr began directing music videos including Jay-Z's "Hard Knock Life (Ghetto Anthem)."

After having directed a number of music videos, Ice Cube hired Carr to direct the sequel to his hit film Friday. The film, the R-rated comedy Next Friday, was Carr's first feature film. He subsequently directed the films Dr. Dolittle 2, Daddy Day Care, Are We Done Yet?, Rebound, and Paul Blart: Mall Cop. He also directed a segment in Movie 43 and executive produced the 2006 TV Movie Santa Baby starring Jenny McCarthy, its sequel Santa Baby 2: Christmas Maybe, and was at one time attached to direct National Security starring Martin Lawrence and Steve Zahn, and an earlier film adaptation of Iron Fist.

Filmography

References

External links
 

English-language film directors
American film producers
Living people
American music video directors
Comedy film directors
Place of birth missing (living people)
1965 births